= Operation Sunable =

World War II military operation

Operation Sunable was a military operation by Australian forces in Timor during World War II.

It was one of a series of disastrous missions Australia sent behind enemy lines in Timor.

== Notes ==
- Silver, Lynette Ramsay (1990). The Heroes of Rimau: Unravelling the Mystery of One of World War II's Most Daring Raids Hardcover. Birchgrove, New South Wales: Sally Milner Publishing. ISBN 9781863510530.
- "The Official History of the Operations and Administration of] Special Operations - Australia [(SOA), also known as the Inter-Allied Services Department (ISD) and Services Reconnaissance Department (SRD)] Volume 2 - Operations -Part 1 p 50-52". National Archives Australia. pp. 125–129.
